The IOF .30-06 sporting rifle is a bolt-action rifle manufactured by the Rifle Factory Ishapore.

As the name suggests, it is chambered in .30-06.

Gallery

References

.30-06 Springfield rifles
Bolt-action rifles of India